The 1954 college football season saw three teams finish unbeaten and untied, with Ohio State Buckeyes and the UCLA Bruins sharing the national championship as the No. 1 picks of the AP Poll and the UPI Poll, respectively.  Although the winners of the Big Ten and the Pacific conferences normally met in the Rose Bowl, a "no repeat" prevented the two champions from meeting.  UCLA, which had been in the Rose Bowl earlier in the year, was replaced by conference runner-up USC.

During the 20th century, the NCAA had no playoff for the college football teams that would later be described as "Division I-A".  The NCAA did recognize a national champion based upon the final results of "wire service" (AP and UPI) polls.  The extent of that recognition came in the form of acknowledgment in the annual NCAA Football Guide of the "unofficial" national champions.  The AP poll in 1954 consisted of the votes of as many as 419 sportswriters.

Though not all writers voted in every poll, each would give their opinion of the twenty best teams.  Under a point system of 20 points for first place, 19 for second, etc., the "overall" ranking was determined.  Although the rankings were based on the collective opinion of the representative sportswriters, the teams that remained "unbeaten and untied" were generally ranked higher than those that had not.  A defeat, even against a strong opponent, tended to cause a team to drop in the rankings, and a team with two or more defeats was unlikely to remain in the Top 20.  Generally, the top teams played on New Year's Day in the four major postseason bowl games: the Rose Bowl (near Los Angeles at Pasadena), the Sugar Bowl (New Orleans), the Orange Bowl (Miami), and the Cotton Bowl (Dallas).

In 1954, a limit of 10 games per season, excluding a bowl game, was imposed on all teams, with the exception that existing contracts would not be changed.

Conference and program changes
The ACC voted to add Virginia as its eighth football-playing member in December 1953.

September
In the preseason poll released on September 13, 1954, No. 1 Notre Dame had the most points, although No. 2 Oklahoma had more first place votes (74 vs. 52).  Rounding out the Top Five were defending champion No. 3 Maryland, No. 4 Texas and No. 5 Illinois.  As the regular season progressed, a new poll would be issued on the Monday following the weekend's games.

September 18, No. 2 Oklahoma won at No. 12 California 27–13, and No. 3 Maryland won at Kentucky, 20–0.  Notre Dame and Texas, No. 1 and No. 4, were preparing to meet at South Bend to open their seasons.  Oklahoma replaced Notre Dame as No. 1 in the first regular poll.  No. 7 Georgia Tech, which beat Tulane 28–0 in Atlanta, replaced Illinois in the Top Five.  Defying high expectations, the Illini would lose their opener to Penn State, 14–12, and finish the season with a 1–8–0 record.  The next poll: No. 1 Oklahoma, No. 2 Notre Dame, No. 3 Maryland, No. 4 Texas, and No. 5 Georgia Tech.

September 25  No. 2 Notre Dame hosted No. 4 Texas and won 21–0.  No. 1 Oklahoma beat No. 20 Texas Christian (TCU) 21–16.   No. 3 Maryland was idle, and No. 5 Georgia Tech lost to Florida, 13–12.  Notre Dame took back over the top spot from O.U., and Texas, Maryland and Georgia Tech were replaced by No. 8 UCLA (32–7 over Kansas), No. 10 Wisconsin (52–14 over Marquette) and No. 11 Iowa (14–10 over No. 7 Michigan State).  The poll: No. 1 Notre Dame, No. 2 Oklahoma, No. 3 Iowa, No. 4 UCLA, and No. 5 Wisconsin.

October
In a Friday game, No. 4 UCLA beat No. 6 Maryland 12–7.  The next day, October 2, No. 1 Notre Dame was upset by No. 19 Purdue, 27–14.  No. 2 Oklahoma which was idle, moved to the top as Notre Dame dropped to eighth.  No. 3 Iowa defeated visiting Montana, 48–6, and No. 5 Wisconsin beat No. 13 Michigan State 6–0. The next poll: No. 1 Oklahoma, No. 2 UCLA, No. 3 Wisconsin, No. 4 Iowa, and No. 5 Purdue.

October 9   No. 1 Oklahoma won its annual game in Dallas against No. 15 Texas, 14–7.  No. 2 UCLA edged Washington 21–20.  No. 3 Wisconsin beat No. 11 Rice 13–7.  No. 4 Iowa lost to unranked Michigan, 14–13, and No. 5 Purdue was tied by No. 6 Duke, 13–13.  No. 10 Ohio State, which had won at Illinois 40–7, entered the Top Five: No. 1 Oklahoma, No. 2 Wisconsin, No. 3 UCLA, No. 4 Ohio State, and No. 5 Purdue.

October 16  No. 2 Wisconsin hosted No. 5 Purdue and won 20–6.  No. 1 Oklahoma visited Kansas and annihilated it, 65–0, while No. 3 UCLA went one better in beating Stanford 72–0.  No. 4 Ohio State beat No. 13 Iowa 20–14. No. 7 Ole Miss, which had beaten Tulane 34–7, entered the Top Five: No. 1 Oklahoma, No. 2 Wisconsin, No. 3 UCLA, No. 4 Ohio State, and No. 5 Mississippi.

October 23 No. 2 Wisconsin faced its second high-ranked opponent in a week, visiting Big Ten rival and No. 4 Ohio State.  OSU won, 31–14, to take the No. 1 spot.  No. 1 Oklahoma beat Kansas State 21–0, and No. 3 UCLA beat Oregon State 61–0.  No. 5 Mississippi lost to No. 7 Arkansas at Little Rock, 6–0.  No. 9 Army, which had won 67–12 at Columbia, moved up.  The next poll: No. 1 Ohio State, No. 2 Oklahoma, No. 3 UCLA, No. 4 Arkansas, and No. 5 Army.

October 30 No. 1 Ohio State won at Northwestern, 14–7.  No. 2 Oklahoma won 13–6 at Colorado.
No. 3 UCLA won at California 27–6 and was given top billing in the next poll.  No. 4 Arkansas won 14–7 at Texas A&M.   No. 5 Army, which got to stay home, edged Virginia 21–20.  No. 6 Notre Dame, which beat No. 15 Navy 6–0 in Baltimore, moved up.  The next poll: No. 1 UCLA, No. 2 Ohio State, No. 3 Oklahoma, No. 4 Arkansas, and No. 5 Notre Dame.

November
November 6  No. 1 UCLA won at Oregon 41–0.  No. 2 Ohio State beat visiting No. 20 Pittsburgh, 26–0.  No. 3 Oklahoma won at Iowa State 40–0.  No. 4 Arkansas, playing at Little Rock, beat No. 15 Rice 28–15, and No. 5 Notre Dame won at Penn, 42–7. The top five remained the same.

November 13 No. 1 UCLA had the week off, while No. 2 Ohio State won at Purdue 28–6 and got back the top rung.   No. 3 Oklahoma beat Missouri 34–13.  No. 4 Arkansas lost to No. 19 SMU, 21–14.  No. 5 Notre Dame beat North Carolina, 42–13.  No. 6 Army, which at won at Penn 35–0, came back to the Top Five: No. 1 Ohio State, No. 2 UCLA, No. 3 Oklahoma, No. 4 Notre Dame, and No. 5 Army.

November 20 No. 1 Ohio State beat No. 12 Michigan 21–7.  In Los Angeles, No. 2 UCLA beat its crosstown rival, No. 7 USC, 34–0.  No. 3 Oklahoma beat Nebraska 55–7.  No. 4 Notre Dame won at No. 19 Iowa 34–18.  No. 5 Army had the day off, preparing for the Army-Navy game. The top five remained the same.

November 27 No. 1 Ohio State and No. 2 UCLA had finished their seasons, both of them undefeated and untied.  No. 3 Oklahoma also finished with a perfect record, winning its annual season-closer at Oklahoma A&M 14–0.  No. 4 Notre Dame beat No. 17 USC 23–17.  In Philadelphia, No. 5 Army was beaten by No. 6 Navy, 27–20. The AP's final top five were No. 1 Ohio State, No. 2 UCLA, No. 3 Oklahoma, No. 4 Notre Dame, and No. 5 Navy, although the Coaches Poll selected UCLA as its top team. Under normal circumstances the Buckeyes and Bruins would have met in the Rose Bowl for a national championship showdown, but the Pacific Coast Conference's short-lived "no-repeat" rule forced UCLA to stay home because they had played in the previous year's Rose Bowl. Instead, Ohio State matched up with No. 17 USC, whom they defeated 20–7.

Conference standings

Major conference standings

Independents

Minor conferences

Minor conference standings

Rankings

Final AP Poll
AP ranked Ohio State as No. 1, while the UPI coaches' poll gave the top spot to UCLA.  Both wire services' rankings were made at the end of the regular season, and were unaffected by the postseason bowl games. Ohio State and UCLA had two common opponents in 1954; Cal and USC. Ohio State defeated Cal 21–13 and USC 20–7, while UCLA defeated Cal 27–6 and USC 34–0.

Final Coaches Poll
The United Press International poll, taken from a panel of 35 coaches, had UCLA as the number one team beginning with the poll released on October 26.  A rival to the AP poll, the UPI prefaced its release with the statement, "The men who know the game the best, the coaches themselves, voted UCLA to the top spot by the slender margin of seven points over Ohio State, the perfect record champions of the Big 10 Conference,"    The UPI poll was a Top Ten, with a first place vote by a coach being worth 10 points, second worth 9 points, etc.  With 350 being the maximum number of points, and 315 being the total for 35 second place votes, the panel was split on whether UCLA or Ohio State was the best team in the nation.  The UPI Top Ten   Ohio State and UCLA had two common opponents in 1954; Cal and USC. Ohio State defeated Cal 21–13 and USC 20–7, while UCLA defeated Cal 27–6 and USC 34–0.

Bowl games

Major bowls

No. 2 UCLA (9–0) and No. 3 Oklahoma (10–0) were idle in bowl season due to conference "no-repeat" rules.

Other bowls

Heisman Trophy voting
The Heisman Trophy is given to the year's most outstanding player

Source:

See also
1954 College Football All-America Team
1954 NCAA football rankings

References